Brecknock was a rural district in the administrative county of Breconshire, Wales, from 1894 - 1974. The district surrounded, but did not include, the town of Brecon, which was a separate municipal borough.

In 1974 local government throughout Wales was reorganised. Under the Local Government Act 1972 the rural district was abolished and it was combined with a number of other districts to form the Borough of Brecknock, one of three districts of the new county of Powys. 

The district comprised the following civil parishes. They are listed below using the spelling current at the times of the rural district's existence:

References

Rural districts of Wales
Brecknockshire